Section 109 of the Constitution of Australia is the part of the Constitution of Australia that deals with the legislative inconsistency between federal and state laws, and declares that valid federal laws override ("shall prevail") inconsistent state laws, to the extent of the inconsistency. Section 109 is analogous to the Supremacy Clause in the United States Constitution and the paramountcy doctrine in Canadian constitutional jurisprudence, and the jurisprudence in one jurisdiction is considered persuasive in the others.

Text
Section 109 of the Constitution of Australia provides that:

Section 109, together with section 5 of the Commonwealth of Australia Constitution Act 1900 (which is not part of the Australian Constitution) have been considered to be the foundation for the existence of the judicial review power in Australia. The section provides:

"Invalidity of a State law" does not mean that the State law is invalid in the positivist sense that the State Parliament lacks power to pass it. The State law, though enacted with full procedural validity, merely ceases to have operative force. Hence, in order for s.109 to come into operation at all, there must be a valid State law and a valid Commonwealth law. When s.109 takes effect, the State law yields to the Commonwealth law, but remains a valid law of the Parliament which enacted it. The practical significance of this will become apparent if, at some later date, the over-riding Commonwealth law ceases to operate. This effect applies also to laws passed by a state (i.e., while it was a colony) prior to the establishment of the Australian Constitution as well as those passed by a state after the Commonwealth had passed a relevant law.

History of approach
The High Court of Australia in D'Emden v Pedder (1904), in the first substantial constitutional case presented before the court, cited and drew on the jurisprudence of the United States case of McCulloch v. Maryland, recognising that the case was not binding. Following the reasoning in the American case, the court adopted the doctrine of implied intergovernmental immunities.

In the Engineers Case (1920), the High Court of Australia swept away the earlier doctrines of implied intergovernmental immunities and reserved State powers, firmly establishing the modern basis for the legal understanding of federalism in Australia. The Court also rejected the use of American precedent and said that they would apply the settled rules of construction giving primacy to the text of the Constitution, anchoring interpretation in its express words. In 2003, former Chief Justice of Australia Sir Anthony Mason wrote:

In conjunction with the doctrine outlined in the Engineers Case, it has also significantly extended the reach of Federal legislative power in Australia.

Approach to interpretation
The evolution of High Court doctrine in s. 109 cases has led to three broad approaches to determine when there is inconsistency:

 is it impossible to obey both laws? (the "simultaneous obedience" test)
 does one law confer a right which the other purports to take away? (the "conferred rights" test)
 does the federal law cover the field in question? (the "cover the field" test)

The first two tests, and in particular the first, are said to involve direct inconsistency, while the third test is said to be one involving indirect inconsistency.

Impossible to obey both laws 
Instances may arise when it is impossible to obey two laws simultaneously. A classical example is R v Licensing Court of Brisbane; Ex parte Daniell. A state referendum on liquor trading hours was fixed by State law for the same day as a federal Senate election. The Commonwealth law provided that a State referendum could not be held on that day. It was held that the State law, to the extent of the inconsistency, was invalid. As Isaacs J. observed:

One law confers a right which the other purports to take away 
In some situations, one law may purport to confer a legal right, privilege or entitlement, while another law purports to take away or diminish some right or entitlement. In other words, one law says that you can do X, the other that you cannot do X. For example, the Commonwealth provision in Colvin v Bradley Brothers Pty Ltd affirmed that employers in certain industries could employ women to work on certain machines whilst the State provision made it an offence to do so. It was not impossible to obey both laws, since nothing in the Commonwealth law required the employment of females. This type of inconsistency may require a working-out of the actual effect of both laws in an individual case. Because of this, it could require a more subtle analysis than test 1. Similar reasoning was later used in Telstra v Worthing, in discussing conflicting workers' compensation laws, and in Bell Group v Western Australia, where a Western Australia Act that sought to accelerate the dissolution and administration of the Bell Group was held to conflict with the Commonwwealth's income tax laws.

Chief Justice Knox and Justice Gavan Duffy agreed in Clyde Engineering Co Ltd v Cowburn that a simple test of logical contradiction was "not sufficient or even appropriate in every case", and enunciated this test:  where one statute confers a right, and the other takes away the right, even if the right may be waived or abandoned, there is an inconsistency, whereupon the State law would then be invalid to the extent of the inconsistency.

Covering the field
It may happen that the Commonwealth law evinces a legislative intention to "cover the field". In such a case there need not be any direct contradiction between the two enactments. What is imputed to the Commonwealth Parliament is a legislative intention that its law shall be all the law there is on that topic. In that event, what is "inconsistent" with the Commonwealth law is the existence of any State law at all on that topic.

The "cover the field" test must be implemented in three steps:

 a finding as to the field or subject matter regulated by the Commonwealth Act,
 a determination as to whether the Commonwealth law intended to regulate that subject matter completely, and
 a determination as to whether the State law interferes with or intrudes upon the field covered by the Commonwealth law.

Questions 1 and 2 can be problematic as they frequently depend on a subjective assessment of the scope and operation of a Commonwealth law. In the absence of express intention, the Court will look to a variety of factors, such as the subject-matter of the law and whether for the law to achieve its purpose it is necessary that it be a complete statement of the law on that topic.

This test involves a more indirect form of inconsistency and makes s 109 a much more powerful instrument for ensuring the supremacy of Commonwealth law.

It had first been suggested by Isaacs J in 1910 in Australian Boot Trade Employees Federation v Whybrow. Justice Dixon had foreshadowed a similar test in 1920 when appearing for the Commonwealth in Commonwealth v Queensland. This test received its first clear formulation in Clyde Engineering Co Ltd v Cowburn by Justice Isaacs. In that case, by covering the field, Isaacs was able to ensure the supremacy of the Commonwealth system.

The "cover the field" test became fully authoritative when Justice Dixon adopted it in Ex parte McLean, stating:

In practice, the three tests overlap. For example, in Commercial Radio Coffs Harbour v Fuller, the finding that there was no inconsistency between Federal and State laws depended on all three tests. In doing so, the reasoning by Mason J. in Ansett Transport Industries (Operations) Pty Ltd v Wardley was affirmed:

Clearing the field 
The Commonwealth can avoid covering a legislative "field" by passing an express provision declaring its intention not to do so. This means in practice that the Commonwealth can control the operation of s.109 in a negative way by making it clear that related State laws are to operate concurrently with the Commonwealth law. The leading case is R v Credit Tribunal; Ex parte General Motors Acceptance Corporation, where Mason J. noted:

See also

 Supremacy Clause—analogous provision in the United States Constitution
 Paramountcy doctrine used in Canadian constitutional jurisprudence

References

Further reading
 
  (1993) 12 University of Tasmania Law Review 182

Australian constitutional law
Federalism in Australia